In queueing models, a discipline within the mathematical theory of probability, the quasi-birth–death process describes a generalisation of the birth–death process. As with the birth-death process it moves up and down between levels one at a time, but the time between these transitions can have a more complicated distribution encoded in the blocks.

Discrete time

The stochastic matrix describing the Markov chain has block structure

where each of A0, A1 and A2 are matrices and A*0, A*1 and A*2 are irregular matrices for the first and second levels.

Continuous time

The transition rate matrix for a quasi-birth-death process has a tridiagonal block structure

where each of B00, B01, B10, A0, A1 and A2 are matrices. The process can be viewed as a two dimensional chain where the block structure are called levels and the intra-block structure phases. When describing the process by both level and phase it is a continuous-time Markov chain, but when considering levels only it is a semi-Markov process (as transition times are then not exponentially distributed).

Usually the blocks have finitely many phases, but models like the Jackson network can be considered as quasi-birth-death processes with infinitely (but countably) many phases.

Stationary distribution

The stationary distribution of a quasi-birth-death process can be computed using the matrix geometric method.

References

Queueing theory
Markov processes